Choristi (before 1927: Τσατάλτζα – Tsataltza,  – Chataldzha) is a town in Drama municipality, Drama regional unit, East Macedonia and Thrace region, Greece.  The town is located about 8 km southeast of Drama and has a population of 2,725 (2011 census). The elevation is approximately 98 m.

History

According to the statistics of Vasil Kanchov ("Macedonia, Ethnography and Statistics"), 1.750 Greek Christians and 300 Turks lived in the village in 1900.
The town was known as Τσατάλτζα – Tsataltza, until renamed in 1927. During World War I from 1916 to 1918 the town was occupied by Bulgarian troops and the local men were shipped out to concentration camps in Bulgaria. Due to abuse, hunger and disease from the 525 hostages of Choristi less than 50 managed to return to Greece.
During World War II, the occupying Axis powers executed a number of people in Choristi as "terrorists" or "resistance fighters" or their sympathizers, this came to be known as the "Choristi Massacre".

References

External links
 "Khoristi, Greece", Falling Rain Genomics, Inc.
 "Khoristi Map — Satellite Images of Khoristi", Maplandia

Populated places in Drama (regional unit)
Drama, Greece